Kalateh-ye Isa or Kalateh Isa may refer to:
 Kalateh-ye Nuri, South Khorasan